The Brasil Open was a tennis tournament held annually in São Paulo, Brazil. It was part of the ATP Tour 250 series, and was one of the main events in the Brazilian tennis calendar alongside ATP Tour 500 Rio Open. Since 2004, it was a part of the South American clay court circuit but was held on hard courts prior to 2004. Nicolás Almagro and Pablo Cuevas hold the record for most singles titles with three each, while in doubles the record is held by Bruno Soares with three consecutive titles from 2011 to 2013. On 15 October 2019, tournament organisers announced that the tournament was being scrapped in favour of a return to the Chile Open.

Past finals

Singles

Doubles

See also
 ATP São Paulo
 São Paulo WCT
 São Paulo Challenger de Tênis

References

External links
   
 Association of Tennis Professionals (ATP) tournament profile

 
Recurring sporting events established in 2001